The Salt Lake Tabernacle organ is a pipe organ located in the Salt Lake Tabernacle in Salt Lake City, Utah. Along with the nearby Conference Center organ, it is typically used to accompany the Tabernacle Choir at Temple Square and is also featured in daily noon recitals. It is one of the largest organs in the world. Jack Bethards, president and tonal director of Schoenstein & Co., describes it as an "American classic organ" and "probably one of the most perfect organs ever built."

Construction

The Tabernacle organ is considered to be one of the finest examples of the American Classic style of organ building. The casework was inspired by the design of the Boston Music Hall organ (which is now housed, since 1909, at the Methuen Memorial Music Hall), the original organ was built in 1863-1867 by an Englishman, Joseph Ridges. Ridges' instrument contained some 700 pipes and was constructed of locally derived materials as much as possible. This original modest 2 manual organ had its console attached to the lower central part of the case and its action was tracker. The organ was later rebuilt and enlarged first by Niels Johnson (1889), the Kimball company of Chicago (1901), the Austin company of Hartford (1915, 1926 & 1937) and finally by the Aeolian-Skinner organ company of Boston (1948).  The organ today is largely the result of the personal involvement of noted Anglo-American organ builder G. Donald Harrison, president of the Aeolian-Skinner organ firm when the tabernacle organ was installed. His collaboration with legendary Tabernacle organist Alexander Schreiner produced this masterwork of American eclectic organ building.

From 1984 to 1988, the organ was meticulously renovated by the Schoenstein organ company of San Francisco, under the leadership of Jack M. Bethards. Issues of balance, tonal regulation, and various mechanical details which had developed or become evident in the preceding 40 years of use were corrected and 17 ranks of new pipework were added to complete and enhance the tonal scheme.

The original iconic façade was expanded with side wings in 1915 by the Fetzer woodworking company of Salt Lake City and remains in that form today.

The pipes are constructed of wood, zinc, and various alloys of tin and lead. Several pipe ranks from the Ridges organ are extant in the instrument today. When it was initially constructed, the organ had  tracker action and was powered by hand-pumped bellows; later it was powered by water from City Creek. Today it is powered by electricity and has electro-pneumatic action.

The organ as it stands today contains 11,623 pipes, 147 speaking stops and  206 ranks (rows of pipes).

Uses
The organ often accompanies the Tabernacle Choir at Temple Square during its weekly radio and television broadcasts of Music and the Spoken Word. It also appears in other concerts, recitals, and in recordings. Since the 1920s it has been traditional to feature the organ in daily half hour solo recitals at noon. During the busy tourist summer season the noon recitals are repeated at 2pm. The Church of Jesus Christ of Latter-day Saints used the organ to accompany music for its biannual general conferences until April 2000, when the church opened its newly constructed Conference Center across the street to the north, which has its own 7708-pipe organ.

Apart from its use by organists of the Tabernacle Choir, guest artists are often invited to perform on the instrument, including Dame Gillian Weir (2007), John Weaver (2007) and Felix Hell (2008). During the COVID-19 pandemic the organ was highlighted in the online series “Piping Up: Organ Concerts at Temple Square" featuring organists streamed on YouTube.

The first recordings of the organ were made by Tabernacle organist John J. McClellan for the Columbia Graphophone Company in 1910 and are the first commercially released recordings of a pipe organ. Many recordings featuring the tabernacle organists and choir have been made over subsequent years and are readily available. In 2020, the organ was used as a graphic element of the new Tabernacle Choir logo identity.

List of stops

References

Further reading 

.

External links

 
 Official Mormon Tabernacle Choir site

Latter Day Saint culture
Salt Lake City, Salt Lake Tabernacle organ
Temple Square